Tertatolol (Artex, Artexal, Prenalex) is a medication in the class of beta blockers, used in the treatment of high blood pressure. It was discovered by the French pharmaceutical company Servier and is marketed in Europe.

Tertatolol has also been shown to act as a serotonin 5-HT1A and 5-HT1B receptor antagonist, similarly to propranolol and pindolol.

See also 
 Hydroxytertatolol

References 

5-HT1A antagonists
5-HT1B antagonists
N-tert-butyl-phenoxypropanolamines
Beta blockers
Thiochromanes